"Pure Souls" is a song by American rapper Kanye West from his tenth studio album, Donda (2021). The song features vocals from fellow American rapper Roddy Ricch and Jamaican singer Shenseea.

Background
In September 2020, West had a rant on his Twitter account where amongst posting his full recording contract with Universal, he posted a video of him urinating on one of his Grammy awards; captioning the post with "Trust me... I won't stop". Roddy Ricch, who is featured on the track, was nominated for six entries at the 2020 Grammy awards, but left the show empty handed. Roddy Ricch called out West in March 2021, believing that he disrespected the Grammys, saying "How do you think that makes the world look at my accomplishment?". In an interview with Big Boy in June 2021, he stated that he had met up with West and recorded music together and that there was no disrespect towards him. Roddy Ricch references the incident on the song, singing "They said I was mad at the Grammys, but I'm looking at my Grammy right now/Pulled up on Ye and said they don't understand me, I just want my dog to pipe down".

The song was first previewed during a listening party at Mercedes-Benz Stadium on July 22, 2021. At the August 5 listening party, West changed part of his verse, removing lines that eluded to his relationship with Barack Obama such as "44 telling me I'm still not folks". At the August 26 listening party at Soldier Field, West added Jamaican singer Shenseea to the track. The collaboration came about after he had watched her freestyle at Hot 97 with Funkmaster Flex, which was uploaded on July 28, 2021. At the listening event, Shenseea joined West on the stairs of his remade childhood home along with artists such as Travis Scott, Marilyn Manson and DaBaby.

Personnel 
Credits adapted from Tidal.
 Co-production - Bastian Völkel, Mike Dean, Ojivolta, Shuko, Sucuki
 Additional production - Fya Man
 Mixing and mastering - Irko
 Record engineering - Alejandro Rodriguez-Dawsøn, Chris Connors, Josh Berg, Mikalai Skrobat, Patrick Hundley, Roark Bailey, Will Chason
 Vocal editing - Chris Connors, Louis Bell

Charts

Weekly charts

Year-end charts

References

Kanye West songs
Roddy Ricch songs
2021 songs
Song recordings produced by Kanye West
Songs written by Kanye West

Songs written by Roddy Ricch
Songs written by Mike Dean (record producer)
Songs written by Cyhi the Prynce
Songs written by Malik Yusef